Hartwell Neil Riser Jr. (born April 25, 1962) is an American politician. He served as a Republican member for the 32nd district of the Louisiana State Senate. Riser is currently a member of the Louisiana House of Representatives.

Riser was born in Columbia, Louisiana. He attended the University of Louisiana at Monroe, where he earned a bachelor's degree in 1984.

In 2007 Riser was elected for the 32nd district of the Louisiana State Senate. In 2017 Riser ran for Louisiana State Treasurer. In 2020, he was succeeded by Glen Womack for the 32nd district of the Louisiana State Senate. In the same year, Riser was elected for the 20th district of the Louisiana House of Representatives. Riser assumed office on January 13, 2020.

References 

1962 births
Living people
People from Columbia, Louisiana
University of Louisiana at Monroe alumni
Republican Party Louisiana state senators
Republican Party members of the Louisiana House of Representatives
21st-century American politicians